Unilateral may refer to:

 Unilateralism, any doctrine or agenda that supports one-sided action
Unilateral, occurring on only one side of an organism (Anatomical terms of location § Medial and lateral)
 Unilateral contract, a contract in which only one party makes a promise
 Unilateral declaration of independence
 Unilateral, a type of amplifier (Amplifier § Unilateral or bilateral)

See also